At least two ships of the Hellenic Navy have borne the name Lesvos or Lesbos, after the Greek island of Lesbos:

 , a  launched in 1942 as USS LST-389 and renamed USS Boone County in 1955. She was transferred to Greece in 1960 and renamed Lesvos. She was decommissioned in 1990.
 , a  commissioned in 1999.

Hellenic Navy ship names